Andrew Wylie (born 6 September 1961) is a British cross-country skier. He competed in the men's relay event at the 1988 Winter Olympics.

References

External links
 

1961 births
Living people
British male cross-country skiers
Olympic cross-country skiers of Great Britain
Cross-country skiers at the 1988 Winter Olympics
Sportspeople from Cambridge